Mr. T Cereal was a sweetened breakfast cereal manufactured by the Quaker Oats Company from 1984 to 1993. The cereal was prepared with corn and oats as primary ingredients, and it was fortified with iron and B vitamins. The cereal box had a cartoon likeness of Mr. T on the box as the cereal's mascot. The cereal pieces were manufactured in the shape of the letter "T". It has been described as being similar in flavor to Cap'n Crunch cereal.

History and marketing
Mr. T Cereal debuted in 1984 and was a popular cereal in the U.S. during the 1980s. The cereal was the first licensed ready-to-eat cereal manufactured and marketed by the Quaker Oats Company.

Elements of marketing and advertising for Mr. T Cereal were geared toward children, per the popularity of Mr. T's media appearances such as in The A-Team and Rocky III. To appeal to children, the cereal was manufactured with a significant amount of sugar. Promotions for the cereal included television advertisements and a stand-up cardboard cutout that was used in supermarkets. Catchphrases for Mr. T Cereal included "Team up with Mr. T, It’s cool" and "I pity the fool who don’t eat my cereal".

A cereal box prize consisted of a packet of Mr. T. stickers, which were packaged inside boxes of the cereal.

Some collectors have collected Mr. T. Cereal, and some collectors have retained unopened boxes of it with the cereal still in the box.

In popular culture

 Mr. T Cereal appeared in the film Pee Wee's Big Adventure, in which Pee Wee Herman held a box of the cereal and poured it over "Mr. Breakfast," a face with fried eggs for eyes and bacon strips for lips on a plate, while imitating Mr. T saying, "I pity the poor fool that don't eat my cereal."
 A box of the cereal also appeared atop the refrigerator of Martin Lawrence's character in the 1992 movie "Boomerang."
 Stranger Things season 3 episode 7 The Bite features the cereal prominently in a display of period goods in Bradley's Big Buy superstore. 
 The cereal would also appear in the film Bumblebee, seen being eaten by Hailee Steinfeld's character Charlie Watson. 
 In season 5 episode 16 of the television show Rules of Engagement, the character Audrey starts a job at a young internet company run by kids. After asking them for something to do, they task her with finding a box of Mr. T cereal for them, which she finds and pays $500 for.

See also

 List of breakfast cereals
 Mister T, the TV series whose characters were featured on the cereal box.

References

Quaker Oats Company cereals
Cultural depictions of Mr. T